Kirby Short (born 3 November 1986) is a former Australian cricketer who played for and captained the Queensland Fire and Brisbane Heat.

Early life and career
Short was born into a sporting family.  Her mother represented Australia at softball and her grandfather, Mick Harvey, played first class cricket for Victoria and Queensland, and was later a Test cricket umpire.  Mick Harvey's brothers, Merv and Neil Harvey, were both Australian Test cricketers; the latter came to prominence as the youngest member of the legendary Invincibles touring team.

Short played under-17 and under-19 indoor cricket for Queensland, and also represented Queensland at youth level in volleyball and softball.

Cricket career
In December 2005, Short made her debut for Queensland Fire.  She was a member of the Brisbane Heat squad from its inaugural WBBL01 season (2015–16).  In January 2017, she became Brisbane Heat's captain, replacing Delissa Kimmince who had stepped down. She later captained the Heat to consecutive WBBL titles in the WBBL04 (2018–19) and WBBL05 (2019–20) tournaments. Members of the Heat squads for those two seasons later told cricket.com.au that in their opinion, Short was far and away the greatest behind-the-scenes influence on the team's victories.

Short retired from representative cricket at the end of the 2019–20 WNCL season.

Personal life
Following Short's retirement, she has been a commentator on radio for the Australian Broadcasting Commission and television on Seven Sport and Fox Cricket. She has worked as a physical education teacher, and has returned to teaching after her retirement from cricket. In 2019 she became deputy principal at MacGregor State High School in Brisbane.

References

External links

1986 births
Australian women cricketers
Brisbane Heat (WBBL) cricketers
Cricketers from Queensland
Living people
Queensland Fire cricketers
Sportswomen from Queensland
Harvey family